Little Troublesome Creek is a  long 2nd order tributary to the Haw River, in Rockingham County, North Carolina.

Course
Little Troublesome Creek rises in a pond located in Reidsville, North Carolina on the divide between Little Troublesome Creek and Troublesome Creek.  Little Troublesome Creek then flows southeast to meet the Haw River about 1 mile southwest of Williamsburg, North Carolina.

Watershed
Little Troublesome Creek drains  of area, receives about 46.7 in/year of precipitation, has a topographic wetness index of 422.04 and is about 33% forested.

See also
List of rivers of North Carolina

References

Rivers of North Carolina
Rivers of Rockingham County, North Carolina